The long jump at the Summer Olympics is grouped among the four track and field jumping events held at the multi-sport event. The men's long jump has been present on the Olympic athletics programme since the first Summer Olympics in 1896. The women's long jump was introduced over fifty years later in 1948 and was the second Olympic jumping event for women after the high jump, which was added in 1928.

Beamon's mark is the longest-standing Olympic athletics record by a margin of twelve years and remains the only time a man has set a long jump world record at the competition. The women's world record has been broken on two occasions at the Olympics, with Mary Rand jumping 6.76 m (22 ft 2 in) in 1964 and Viorica Viscopoleanu clearing 6.82 m (22 ft 4+1⁄2 in) in 1968. In 1956 Elżbieta Krzesińska jumped 6.35 m (20 ft 10 in) to equal her own world record.12th IAAF World Championships In Athletics: IAAF Statistics Handbook Berlin 2009 (pgs. 546, 556, 646). IAAF (2009). Retrieved on 2014-05-03.</ref>

Ellery Clark and Olga Gyarmati were the first men's and women's Olympic long jump champions. Jeff Henderson and Tianna Bartoletta are the reigning Olympic champions from 2016. Carl Lewis is the event's most successful athlete as he was Olympic champion four times consecutively from 1984 to 1996. Heike Drechsler is the only woman to win two Olympic long jump titles. Ralph Boston and Jackie Joyner-Kersee are the only other two athletes to win three Olympic long jump medals in their careers. The United States is the most successful nation in the event.

A standing long jump variant of the event was contested from 1900 to 1912 and standing jumps specialist Ray Ewry won all but one of the gold medals in its brief history.

Medalists

Men

Multiple medalists

Medalists by country

Women

Multiple medalists

Medalists by country

 The German total includes teams both competing as Germany and the United Team of Germany, but not East or West Germany.

Standing long jump

From 1900 to 1912 a variation of the event was contested at the Olympics where athletes had to long jump from a standing position. This was one of three standing jumps to have featured on the Olympic programme, alongside the standing high jump (present for the same period) and the standing triple jump (1900 and 1904 only).

The standing jump competitions were dominated by Ray Ewry, who won the Olympic standing long jump titles in 1900, 1904 and 1908. Ewry took Olympic three gold medals in standing jumps in both 1900 and 1904, then won the standing high and long jumps at the 1908 Olympics, as well as the 1906 Intercalated Games. After Ewry's retirement, Kostas Tsiklitiras became the winner of the final Olympic standing long jump competition in 1912.

The standing long jump—and standing jump events in general—had been a relatively common type of athletics event at the end of the 19th century, but became increasingly rare at top level national and international competitions as the 20th century progressed. The Olympic event remains the only major international competition to have featured the event, except for the first three editions of the Women's World Games in the 1920s, as well as the 1919 and 1920 editions of the South American Championships in Athletics. The standing long jump retained some popularity as a championship event in Scandinavia in the second half of the century.

Intercalated Games
The 1906 Intercalated Games were held in Athens and at the time were officially recognised as part of the Olympic Games series, with the intention being to hold a games in Greece in two-year intervals between the internationally held Olympics. However, this plan never came to fruition and the International Olympic Committee (IOC) later decided not to recognise these games as part of the official Olympic series. Some sports historians continue to treat the results of these games as part of the Olympic canon.

Continuing its presence since the first Olympics, a men's long jump event was contested at the 1906 Games. The two protagonists were Myer Prinstein (the 1904 champion) and Peter O'Connor (the world record holder). O'Connor was runner-up in  but protested the measuring of Prinstein's mark and the judgement of no-jump rulings against him.

The standing long jump variant was also contested at the Intercalated Games. It was an American podium sweep with Martin Sheridan and Lawson Robertson taking second and third place.

Non-canonical Olympic events
In addition to the main 1900 Olympic men's long jump, a handicap competition was held four days later. Pál Koppán of Hungary won with a mark of 7.895 m (1.60 m handicap) and John McLean of the United States came second with 7.72 m (85 cm handicap). Sources differ as to whether the third-place finisher William Percy Remington (who was fourth in the main Olympic event) or Thaddeus McClain (seventh in the Olympic long jump).

Two professionals-only contests were held in 1900. Mike Sweeney of the United States won with 5.995 m. Another American, Otto Bruno Schoenfeld, was second in 5.60 m, while Frenchman Jules Bouchoux came third in 5.55 m. A handicap professional contest was also held but the results have not been located.

The handicap event returned at the 1904 Summer Olympics and the three Olympic finalists who failed to win medals comprised the top three – all of them American. Fred Englehardt won with 6.82 m, Gilbert Van Cleve was runner-up with a mark of 6.53 m, and John Hagerman took third, recording 6.53 m. The corresponding handicaps are not known.

These events are no longer considered part of the official Olympic history of the long jump or the athletics programme in general. Consequently, medals from these competitions have not been assigned to nations on the all-time medal tables.

References
Participation and athlete data
Athletics Men's Long Jump Medalists. Sports Reference. Retrieved on 2014-05-03.
Athletics Women's Long Jump Medalists. Sports Reference. Retrieved on 2014-05-03.
Olympic record progressions
Mallon, Bill (2012). TRACK & FIELD ATHLETICS - OLYMPIC RECORD PROGRESSIONS. Track and Field News. Retrieved on 2014-05-03.
Specific

External links
IAAF long jump homepage
Official Olympics website
Olympic athletics records from Track & Field News

 
Olympics
Long jump